Jules Léon-Jean Combarieu (4 February 1859 – 4 February 1916) was a French musicologist and music critic.

Life 
Like his elder brother,  (born 30 January 1856 in Cahors) who was to become the Private Secretary of Président de la République Émile Loubet, Jules Combarieu was the son of Henri Combarieu, a printer, and Marie-Louise Salbant, who married in Quercy in 1855. He first studied at la Sorbonne, then in Berlin with Philipp Spitta. He was first a professor of letters at the Lycee de Cahors. In 1894, he received the title of doctor of letters with Les Rapports de la Musique et de la poésie considérées au point de vue de l'expression.

In 1901, Combarieu founded the Revue d'histoire et de critique musicales, which became La Revue musicale in 1904 before merging with the journal of the Société internationale de musique (S.I.M.) in 1912.

Between 1904 et 1910, he was professor of music at the Collège de France.

His brother Abel Combarieu was the uncle of diplomat and writer Paul Morand, a member of the Académie française.

Works
Le Rapport de la poésie et de la musique considérée du point de vue de l'expression (thesis, 1893)
"L'Influence de la musique allemande sur la musique française", in: Jahrbuch Peters (1895)
 studies in musical philology:
Théorie du rythme dans la composition moderne d'après la doctrine antique (1896)
Essai sur l'archéologie musicale au XXe et le problème de l'origine des neumes (1896)
– these two works were awarded the prize of the Académie)
Fragment de l'Énéide en musique d'après un manuscrit inédit (1898)
Élément de grammaire musicale historique (1906)
La Musique: ses lois, son évolution (Paris, Flammarion, 1907)  (numerous editions in English), Prix Charles Blanc of the Académie française
 (3 volumes, Paris 1913–19, an authoritative work – then 5 volumes with René Dumesnil, Armand Colin 1955–1960). 
 Poésies de Valentin (Henri Bourette), ( and Jules Combarieu) (Cahors: Lemerre, 1885)

Sources
Dictionnaire bibliographique des musiciens (éditions Robert Laffont).

References

External links
 La musique au Moyen-âge in Revue de synthèse, tome I, I.1, p. 84 - 110, August 1900
 Jules Combarieu on the site of the Académie française
 Jules Combarieu. La musique et la magie ; étude sur les origines populaires de l'art musical ; son influence et sa fonction dans les sociétés. (compte-rendu) on Persée
 Jules Combarieu on Encyclopédie larousse on line

People from Cahors
1859 births
1916 deaths
19th-century French musicologists
20th-century French musicologists
Academic staff of the Collège de France
Lycée Louis-le-Grand teachers